Jesse R. Moye House is a historic home located at Greenville, Pitt County, North Carolina.  It was designed by architect Herbert Woodley Simpson and built in 1902. It is a -story, Queen Anne style frame dwelling with Colonial Revival style details.  It has a large wraparound front porch, multiple projections, and multiple gable roofline.

It was added to the National Register of Historic Places in 1997.

References

Houses on the National Register of Historic Places in North Carolina
Queen Anne architecture in North Carolina
Colonial Revival architecture in North Carolina
Houses completed in 1902
Houses in Pitt County, North Carolina
National Register of Historic Places in Greenville, North Carolina